The 2008 MTV Video Music Awards Japan were held on Saturday, May 31 at Saitama Super Arena in Saitama, Japan.

Awards
Winners are in bold text.

Video of the Year
Exile — "I Believe"
 Mr. Children — "Irodori"
 Rihanna featuring Jay-Z — "Umbrella"
 Tokyo Incidents — "OSCA"
 Kanye West — "Stronger"

Album of the Year
Exile — Exile Love
 Ketsumeishi — Ketsunopolice 5
 Kumi Koda — Kingdom
 Avril Lavigne — The Best Damn Thing
 Ne-Yo — Because of You

Best Male Video
Ne-Yo — "Because of You"
 Chris Brown featuring T-Pain — "Kiss Kiss"
 Ken Hirai — "Fake Star"
 Tamio Okuda — "Mugen no Kaze"
 Seamo — "Cry Baby"

Best Female Video
Fergie — "Big Girls Don't Cry"
 Alicia Keys — "No One"
 Kumi Koda — "Ai no Uta"
 Mika Nakashima — "Life"
 Ai Otsuka — "Peach"

Best Group Video
M-Flo Loves Emi Hinouchi, Ryohei, Emyli, Yoshika and Lisa — "Love Comes and Goes"
 Maroon 5 — "Makes Me Wonder"
 Mr. Children — "Irodori"
 Rip Slyme — "I.N.G"
 Sum 41 — "Underclass Hero"

Best New Artist
Motohiro Hata — "Uroko"
 Erika — "Free"
 Mika — "Grace Kelly"
 Satomi Takasugi — "Tabibito"
 Amy Winehouse — "Rehab"

Best Rock Video
Radwimps — "Order Made"
 9mm Parabellum Bullet — "Discommunication"
 Foo Fighters — "The Pretender"
 L'Arc-en-Ciel — "Seventh Heaven"
 Linkin Park — "What I've Done"

Best Pop Video
Avril Lavigne — "Girlfriend"
 Fergie — "Clumsy"
 M-Flo Loves Emi Hinouchi, Ryohei, Emyli, Yoshika and Lisa — "Love Comes and Goes"
 Ai Otsuka — "Peach"
 Yui — "Love & Truth"

Best R&B Video
Namie Amuro — "Hide & Seek"
 AI — "I'll Remember You"
 Mary J. Blige featuring Lil Mama — "Just Fine"
 Chris Brown featuring T-Pain — "Kiss Kiss"
 Miliyah Kato featuring Wakadanna — "Lalala"

Best Hip-Hop VideoSoulja Boy — "Crank That" 50 Cent featuring Justin Timberlake and Timbaland — "Ayo Technology (She Wants It)"
 Kreva — "Strong Style"
 Kanye West — "Stronger"
 T.I. — "Big Things Poppin'

Best Reggae VideoShōnan no Kaze — "Suirenka" Fire Ball — "Place in your Heart"
 Sean Kingston — "Beautiful Girls"
 Mavado — "Dreaming"
 Pushim — "Hey Boy"

Best Dance VideoThe Chemical Brothers — "Do It Again" Denki Groove — "Shounen Young"
 Justice — "D.A.N.C.E."
 Shinichi Osawa — "Our Song (A Lonely Girl Ver.)"
 Ryukyudisko featuring Beat Crusaders — "Nice Day"

Best Video From a FilmHikaru Utada — "Beautiful World" (from Evangelion: 1.0 You Are (Not) Alone) Ketsumeishi — "Deai no Kakera" (from Kage Hinata ni Saku)
 Linkin Park — "What I've Done" (from Transformers)
 Snow Patrol — "Signal Fire" (from Spider-Man 3)
 Yui — "Love & Truth" (from Closed Note)

Best CollaborationKumi Koda featuring TVXQ — "Last Angel" Beyoncé and Shakira — "Beautiful Liar"
 Yuna Ito x Celine Dion — "A World to Believe In"
 Toshinobu Kubota meets Kreva — "M☆A☆G☆I☆C"
 Timbaland featuring The Hives — "Throw It On Me"

Best Karaokee! SongExile — "Toki no Kakera" Avril Lavigne — "Girlfriend"
 Mika Nakashima — "Life"
 Ne-Yo — "Because of You"
 Shōnan no Kaze — "Suireka"

Red Hot AwardInfinity 16 Funky Monkey Babys
 Megumi
 Satomi Takasugi
 Foxxi MisQ

Best buzz ASIA
JapanAI — "I'll Remember You" AAA — "Mirage"
 Double — "Spring Love"
 Micro — "Hana Uta"
 DJ Ozma — "Tokyo Boogie Back"

South KoreaCherry Filter — "Feel It" Clazziquai — "Robotica"
 JYP — "Kiss"
 Leessang — "Ballerino"
 T — "Did You Forget"

TaiwanAndy Lau — "One" Eason Chan — "Long time no see"
 Jay Chou — "Cowboy On The Run"
 Wang Leehom — "Falling Leaf Returns to Root"
 Sodagreen — "Incomparable Beauty"

Special awards
MTV Video Vanguard Award Mariah Carey 

MTV Rock The World Award Takeshi Kobayashi and Kazutoshi Sakurai'''

Live performances 
Ayaka — "Okaeri"
Exile — "24 karats-type EX"
Fergie — "Big Girls Don't Cry"
Mariah Carey — "I'll Be Lovin' U Long Time"
Nelly and Fergie — "Party People"
Orange Range — "O2"
Simple Plan — "When I'm Gone"

Red carpet live
Colbie Caillat
Flo Rida
Miliyah Kato
W-inds

Guest celebrities

AAA
AI
Namie Amuro
Aqua Timez
Asia Engineer
Bono
Double
Foxxi misQ
Funky Monkey Babys
Hata Motohiro
Ikimono-gakari
Yuna Ito
KCO
Rinko Kikuchi
Tetsuya Komuro
Leah Dizon

Shota Matsuda
Megumi
Mihimaru GT
Shun Oguri
Paris Hilton
Ruy Ramos
Seamo
Shōnan no Kaze
Suzanne
Satomi Takasugi
Verbal from M-Flo
Akiko Wada
Dongfeng
Yu Yamada
Zeebra
Aktion aka Claude Maki

2008 in Japanese music